Ion Dragoumis is a municipal unit of Orestida municipality in the Kastoria regional unit, Western Macedonia, Greece. Until the 2011 local government reform it was a separate municipality. It was named after the Greek diplomat and protagonist of the Macedonian Struggle, Ion Dragoumis. The municipal unit has an area of 134.335 km2, and a population of 2,899 (2011). The seat of the former municipality was in Vogatsiko.

References

Populated places in Kastoria (regional unit)
Former municipalities in Western Macedonia